The Binding is a 2020 Italian film directed by Domenico Emanuele de Feudis, written by Daniele Cosci, Davide Orsini and Domenico Emanuele de Feudis and starring Riccardo Scamarcio, Michael C. Pizzuto and Federica Rosellini. While visiting her fiancé's mother in southern Italy, a woman must fight off a mysterious and malevolent curse intent on claiming her young daughter.

Production 
The shooting of the film took place in 2019 entirely in Apulia, in southern Italy, between the village of Selva di Fasano and Monopoli, part of the Metropolitan City of Bari.

Distribution 
The film was released on October 2 distributed by the Netflix platform.

Cast 
 Riccardo Scamarcio
 Mía Maestro
 Michael C. Pizzuto
 Federica Rosellini
 Sebastiano Filocamo as Don Gino

References

External links
 
 

2020 films
Italian-language Netflix original films
2020s Italian-language films
Italian horror thriller films
2020s Italian films